Les Parias de la Gloire English title Pariahs of Glory or Outcasts of Glory is a 1964 French/Italian/Spanish international co-production filmed in Spain. Directed and co-written by Henri Decoin, it is set during the First Indochina War and is based on the 1953 novel of the same name by Roger Delpey who also co-wrote the screenplay.  Delpey served as an infantryman in the 151st Infantry Regiment from 1947–1949 in French Indochina then remained as a war correspondent writing four volumes of Soldats de Boue (Mud Soldiers).

Plot
During World War II a young Frenchmen sees his brother killed in Alsace by a German officer.  He vows revenge on all Germans, but after the War he is conscripted into the French Army and sent to Indochina.  There he meets his brother's killer under strange circumstances.

Cast

Curd Jürgens ... Ludwig Goetz 
Maurice Ronet ... Ferrier 
Folco Lulli ... Blosky 
Roland Lesaffre ... La Coquille 
Germán Cobos ... Albertini 
Pedro Osinaga ... Bertaux 
Tiny Yong  ... Chinese girl

References

External links

1964 films
1960s French-language films
French war films
First Indochina War films
French black-and-white films
Films based on French novels
Films shot in Spain
Films directed by Henri Decoin
Films scored by Giovanni Fusco
1964 war films
1960s French films